Indonesian Driving License (abbreviated as SIM) is a legal document required in Indonesia before they are allowed to drive a motor vehicle. The Indonesian driving license is issued by the Indonesian National Police (Polri). The general requirements for a license in Indonesia are to be at least 17 years old (for A-class; different age requirement exist for each class), pass the theory test, and pass the practical test.

Requirements for Indonesian Driving License
Indonesian Driving License (SIM) individual applicant requirements under Indonesia's Article 81 paragraph (2), (3), (4), and (5) of Law no. 22 of 2009 (Pasal 81 ayat (2), (3), (4), dan (5) UU No. 22 Tahun 2009)

 Age
 17 years old for issue of Driving License class: A, C, and D
 20 years old for issue of Driving License class: B1
 21 years old for issue of Driving License class: B2
 Administration
 Owning legal identification ID card or KTP (Kartu Tanda Penduduk)
 Fill in application form
 Finger Print
 Health
 Having good health and physical condition according from doctor's check up form
 Physically and mentally healthy as well as passing the psychological test 
 Test and Examination
 Theory Exam
 Practical Exam or Examination of driving simulator skills

Additional conditions pursuant to Article 81 paragraph (6) Law. 22 of 2009 (Pasal 81 ayat (6) UU No. 22 Tahun 2009) for any motor vehicle driver who will apply:
 Driving License class B1, have to own Driving License class A at least 12 months, and those who would also apply:
 Driving License class B2, have to own Driving License class B1 at least 12 months
 Driving License class B3, have to own Driving License class B1 at least 12 months

Classes

 A – to drive private passenger car or cargo vehicle with maximum allowable weight not exceeding 3,500 kg (three thousand five hundred kilograms)
 A Public (A UMUM) - to drive commercial vehicles and goods carrier with maximum allowable weight not exceeding 3,500 kg
 B1 – to drive private passenger or cargo vehicle with weight allowed exceeding 3,500 kg
 B1 Public (B1 UMUM) - to drive commercial passenger vehicles and general freight with maximum allowable weight exceeding 3,500 kg
 B2 - to drive private heavy equipment vehicles, towing vehicles, or motor vehicles with semi-trailer or individual trailer with maximum allowable weight exceeding 1,000 kg trailer/s
 B2 Public (B2 UMUM) - to drive commercial vehicles for towing with semi-trailer or individual trailer with maximum allowable weight exceeding 1,000 kg trailer/s
 C – to drive motorcycles 
 D – to drive special vehicle for disabled person

Translation of the Front Side of the Indonesian Driving License

                                                     INDONESIA                                               DRIVING LICENSE
  INDONESIAN POLICE LOGO                             DRIVING LICENSE                                     (DRIVING LICENSE CLASS)
                                                                                                         (DRIVING LICENSE NUMBER)

                                           1. [NAME]                                                                                    
                                           2. PLACE, DATE OF BIRTH:[DOB in dd-mm-yyyy]
           PHOTO                           3. (BLOOD TYPE (A/B/AB/O) - [Sex: Pria=Male, Wanita=Female]
                                           4. (ADDRESS)
                                           5. OCCUPATION: [occupation in Indonesia]
                                           6. PROVINCE OF REGISTRATION        
                     
  

                                                                                                                  PHOTO(IN BLACK AND WHITE)
                        

      (holder's signature)                                                                                        EXPIRY DATE:[DD-MM-YYYY]

Translation of the Rear/Back Side of the Indonesian Driving License 
                                                           
                                                                ATTENTION

1. Counterfeiting a Driving License (SIM) is in violation of Article 263 KUHP, which may be sentenced to prison at a maximum of 6 years
2. Traffic violation by the driver is given a weighted mark which is recorded by the data centre of the Indonesian National Police in such categories:
           a. Light violation (administrative) is weighted by one mark
           b. Medium violation (resulted in traffic disturbance) is weighted by three marks
           c. Heavy violation (resulted in a traffic accident)is weighted by five marks
3. For license holders who acted in violation in which is weighted by over than 12 marks, the driving license may be revoked or may result in a re-test during the license extension period (Perkap Number 9 Year 2012 about Driving License)

 CALL CENTRE: 1500669

International driving permit
Indonesia is not a party to the 1949 Geneva Convention on Road Traffic, but the International Driving Permit (IDP) is honored and is issued by the Indonesian National Police (POLRI). Holders of the Indonesian driving license does not need to acquire International driving permit to drive in any ASEAN countries in accordance with The Kuala Lumpur Agreement of 1985.

References
  Law No. 22 Year 2009 (UU No.22 Tahun 2009)

External links
  Indonesia Motor Association (IMI)
  Indonesian National Police (Polri)
  Directorate General of Land Transportation, Ministry of Transportation Republic of Indonesia

Driving licences by country
Road transport in Indonesia